Edna Brady Cornwell (1868–1958) was the wife of former Governor of West Virginia John J. Cornwell and served as that state's First Lady, 1917-1921.  She was born May 26, 1868, at Romney, West Virginia. In 1891 she married John J. Cornwell, publisher of the Hampshire Review.  As first lady, she hosted social gatherings and participated in Charleston civic affairs. After leaving office, the Cornwells returned to Romney, West Virginia.  After Gov. Cornwell died in 1953, Edna Cornwell continued as publisher of the Hampshire Review until her death on December 1, 1958.

References

1868 births
1958 deaths
American newspaper publishers (people)
Burials at Indian Mound Cemetery
Cornwell family
Editors of West Virginia newspapers
First Ladies and Gentlemen of West Virginia
People from Romney, West Virginia
West Virginia Democrats